Rafael Usín Guisado (born 22 May 1987), commonly known as Rafa Usín, is a Spanish futsal player who plays for FC Barcelona Futsal as a Pivot.

References

External links
LNFS profile
RFEF profile
UEFA profile

1987 births
Living people
Spanish men's futsal players
Xota FS players
Sportspeople from Madrid